The 2005 season was the Hawthorn Football Club's 81st season in the Australian Football League and 104th overall.

Fixture

Premiership season

Ladder

References

Hawthorn Football Club seasons